Spathochlamys is a genus of scallops, marine bivalve molluscs in the taxonomic subfamily Pedinae of the family Pectinidae.

Species
 Spathochlamys benedicti (Verrill & Bush [in Verrill], 1897)
 Spathochlamys martinicensis Paulmier, 2018
 Spathochlamys vestalis (Reeve, 1853)

References

 Coan, E. V.; Valentich-Scott, P. (2012). Bivalve seashells of tropical West America. Marine bivalve mollusks from Baja California to northern Peru. 2 vols, 1258 pp.

External links
 Waller, T. R. (1993). The evolution of "Chlamys" (Mollusca: Bivalvia: Pectinidae) in the tropical western Atlantic and eastern Pacific. American Malacological Bulletin. 10 (2): 195-249.

Pectinidae
Bivalve genera